F. carbonaria  may refer to:
 Fannia carbonaria, a fly species
 Faerberia carbonaria, a fungus species

See also
 Carbonaria (disambiguation)